Four-time defending champion Martina Navratilova successfully defended her title, defeating Steffi Graf in the final, 7–6(8–6), 6–3, 6–2 to win the singles tennis title at the November edition of the 1986 Virginia Slims Championships. It was her eighth Tour Finals singles title.

Seeds

  Martina Navratilova (champion)
  Steffi Graf (final)
  Hana Mandlíková  (quarterfinals)
  Helena Suková (semifinals)
  Pam Shriver (semifinals)
  Claudia Kohde-Kilsch  (quarterfinals)
  Manuela Maleeva (quarterfinals)
  Kathy Rinaldi (first round)

Draw

See also
WTA Tour Championships appearances

References
 1986 Virginia Slims Championships (November) Draw

Singles 1986
Singles